Craig Cutler is an American Photographer. His work has been featured in Newsweek, The New York Times Magazine, Bon Appétit, Best Life, Details, Dwell, and Men's Journal. He has photographed Advertisements for a wide range of clients, including Starbucks, Vanguard, Xbox 360, Mobil, Microsoft, and Sprint. His photos were featured in the book International Harvester, McCormick, Navistar: Milestones in the Company That Helped Build America (Graphic Arts Center Publishing, 2007).

In 2008, Cutler was selected for inclusion in the book American Photography 23, and in 2009, he won a Graphis Gold Award. Cutler's work has been exhibited at Galerie-Atelier Beeld in the Hague.

The subject of the short is 2015 National Men's Elite Boxing champion Chordale Booker and his success in the ring following legal issues and a judge's leniency to put him on probation rather than in prison. The film was awarded the Big Apple Film Festival's Best Short Documentary.

External links 
"Craig Cutler Just Keeps Shooting," PDN, May 2012.
Collaborations with Mason Vickers Productions.
Craig Cutler works featured on artnet.
"Altpick Photographers Featured in American Photography 23," July 11, 2007.
"Creative Ads Placed on Conveyor Belts," 2008.
"Q&A: A Time Before Instantaneous," Communication Arts website, March 11, 2009.
official site
"The Boxer" Official Film Site

References 

Living people
American photographers
University of Delaware alumni
Year of birth missing (living people)
Place of birth missing (living people)